Gina Hackett Curry (born October 23, 1972) is an American politician who is currently representing the 164th district in the Pennsylvania House of Representatives since 2021. Prior to her election she served on the Upper Darby School Board. Curry holds a Bachelors and Masters degree from Saint Joseph's University.

External links

References 

Living people
People from Delaware County, Pennsylvania
Democratic Party members of the Pennsylvania House of Representatives
African-American state legislators in Pennsylvania
21st-century American politicians
1972 births
21st-century African-American politicians
20th-century African-American people